Inverquiech Castle is a ruined 13th century castle near Inverquiech, Perth and Kinross, Scotland.

History
Built at the confluence of the Quiech Burn and the River Isla. Inverquiech was a royal castle, with King Alexander II of Scotland signing a charter here in 1244. King Edward I of England stayed one night at the castle during his invasion of Scotland in 1296, before travelling to Forfar. The castle was in the hands of the Lindsay family in the 14th century.

References
Coventry, Martin. (2008) Castles of the Clans: the strongholds and seats of 750 Scottish families and clans. Musselburgh. p.335.
Prestwich, Michael (1997). Edward I. New Haven, US: Yale University Press. 

Ruined castles in Perth and Kinross